Yuhei Sato (佐藤 優平, born 29 October 1990) is a Japanese footballer who plays as a midfielder for Jeonnam Dragons in K League 2.

Career

Yokohama F. Marinos
Sato officially made his debut for Yokohama F. Marinos in the J. League Division 1 on 9 March 2013 against Shimizu S-Pulse in which he came on as a 90th minute stoppage time substitute from Shunsuke Nakamura as Yokohama won the match 5–0.

In 2022, Sato joined Jeonnam Dragons of K League 2.

Career statistics
Updated to end of 2018 season.

Honours
Yokohama F. Marinos
Emperor's Cup: 2013

References

External links 
 Profile at Tokyo Verdy
 Profile at Montedio Yamagata 

 

1990 births
Living people
Kokushikan University alumni
Association football people from Kanagawa Prefecture
Japanese footballers
Association football midfielders
Expatriate footballers in South Korea
Japanese expatriate sportspeople in South Korea
J1 League players
J2 League players
K League 2 players
Yokohama F. Marinos players
Albirex Niigata players
Montedio Yamagata players
Tokyo Verdy players
Jeonnam Dragons players